The Parnassos Literary Society was founded in 1865 in Athens and has published various magazines.  The oldest literary society in mainland Greece, it continues to be active today.

The Society was founded on 24 June 1865 by the four children of the numismatist  to contribute to the spiritual, social, and moral improvement of the Greek people through its events. Its first president was Michael Lambros. The club quickly became well-known, and functioned as a sort of Academy with literary, archaeological, legal, artistic and even scientific sections. It organized lectures, exhibitions, and various competitions. In 1872, at the suggestion of S. Vassiliadis, it opened a night school for destitute children. The historian Constantine Paparrigopoulos became honorary chairman.

It was officially recognized as a nonprofit organization by the Greek state on March 17, 1875.

The club is now housed in a private mansion on the St. George Square designed by Ifikratis Kokkidis (Ιφικράτης Κοκκίδης). The club has a valuable library and art gallery with 250 works by Greek artists.

Publications

From 1877–1895, the club published the magazine Parnassos (Παρνασσός).

From 1896–1939, it published Epeteris (Επετηρίς, "Yearbook").

From 1959 to the present, the club has published a second series of Parnassos quarterly.

Notes

Bibliography

External links 
 
 

Writers' organizations by country
Greek culture
Organizations established in 1865
Literary magazines published in Greece
Culture in Athens
1865 establishments in Greece